The Zoological Society of Ireland (ZSI) is the body responsible for running Dublin Zoo, where it is based, and Fota Wildlife Park in County Cork.  It is the successor to the Royal Zoological Society of Ireland (RZSI), a learned society for the study of zoology.

The original ZSI was founded in Dublin on 10 May 1830 at a meeting in the Rotunda Hospital called and chaired by the Duke of Leinster, "to form a collection of living animals on the plan to the Zoological Society of London".  Dublin Zoo opened in September 1831 in the Phoenix Park.  The Society's first general meeting was held in November 1832.  In 1838, the Zoo held an open day to mark the coronation of Queen Victoria and the Society was rewarded with the prefix "Royal" in its name.

In October 1993, the members of the RZSI voted to dissolve the society and transfer its assets to a new non-profit limited company called "Zoological Society of Ireland Limited".  This was to facilitate government and private funding arrangements for future development. Responsibility for government assistance was transferred at the same time from the Department of Education to the Office of Public Works.

References

External links
 Skin of a Persian lioness, belonging to an endangered subspecies of lions, brought to Dublin by King Edward VII in 1902.

Zoological societies
Learned societies of Ireland
Organizations disestablished in 1993
Organizations established in 1993
Scientific organizations established in 1830
1830 establishments in Ireland
Scientific organisations based in Ireland
Organisations based in Dublin (city)
Zoological Society of Ireland